Byles is an English surname (spelling variations Biles, Boyles, Billes, Bailie, Bill and others) and/or transliteration of the Gaelic O'Boyles. People with that name include:

 Dan Byles (born 1974), British politician, ocean rower and polar explorer
 Edward Byles Cowell (1826 – 1903), translator of Persian poetry and the first professor of Sanskrit at Cambridge University
 Gary Byles, contemporary Australian Army officer
 Janice Byles (born 1944), later Janice Meek, ocean rower and polar explorer
 John Barnard Byles (1801 – 1884), British barrister
 Junior Byles (born 1948), Jamaican reggae singer
 Marie Byles (1900 – 1979), conservationist, solicitor and author
 Mather Byles (1706 – 1788), British North American clergyman
 Thomas Byles (1870 – 1912), British Catholic priest, passenger on the RMS Titanic
 William Byles (1839 – 1917), British newspaper owner and Liberal politician